Petersburg James A. Johnson Airport  is a state owned, public use airport located one nautical mile (2 km) southeast of the central business district of Petersburg, a city in the Petersburg Borough of the U.S. state of Alaska that has no road access to the outside world. Airline service is subsidized by the Essential Air Service program.

As per Federal Aviation Administration records, the airport had 19,901 passenger boardings (enplanements) in calendar year 2008, 17,988 enplanements in 2009, and 18,468 in 2010. It is included in the National Plan of Integrated Airport Systems for 2015–2019, which categorized it as a primary commercial service (nonhub) airport (more than 10,000 enplanements per year) based on 18,800 enplanements in 2012.

Facilities and aircraft
Petersburg James A. Johnson Airport has one runway designated 5/23 with an asphalt surface measuring 6,400 by 150 feet (1,951 x 46 m).

For the 12-month period ending December 31, 2011, the airport had 13,492 aircraft operations, an average of 36 per day: 15% general aviation, 74% air taxi, 10% scheduled commercial, and 1% military. At that time there were 18 aircraft based at this airport: 83% single-engine and 17% helicopter.

Airlines and destinations

Passenger

Alaska Airlines operates daily Boeing 737-700 passenger and formerly operated Boeing 737-400 passenger/cargo Combi aircraft jet service from the airport.

Top destinations

References

Other sources

 Essential Air Service documents (Docket OST-1998-4899) from the U.S. Department of Transportation:
 Order 2004-5-5 (May 4, 2004): tentatively reselects Alaska Airlines, Inc., to provide subsidized essential air service at Cordova, Gustavus, Petersburg, Wrangell, and Yakutat (southeast) Alaska, for the period from October 1, 2003, through April 30, 2006, at an annual rate of $5,723,008.
 Order 2006-3-20 (March 22, 2006): re-selecting Alaska Airlines, Inc., to provide subsidized essential air service at Cordova, Gustavus, Petersburg, Wrangell, and Yakutat (southeast) Alaska, for the period from May 1, 2006, through April 30, 2009.
 Order 2009-2-3 (February 9, 2009): re-selecting Alaska Airlines, Inc., to provide essential air service (EAS) at Cordova, Gustavus, and Yakutat, for an annual subsidy rate of $5,793,201 and at Petersburg and Wrangell at an annual subsidy rate of $1,347,195, through April 30, 2011.
 Order 2011-2-1 (February 1, 2011): re-selecting Alaska Airlines, Inc., to provide essential air service (EAS) at Cordova, Gustavus, and Yakutat, for an annual subsidy rate of $4,486,951 and at Petersburg and Wrangell at an annual subsidy rate of $3,415,987, from May 1, 2011, through April 30, 2013.
 Order 2013-2-10 (February 11, 2013): re-selecting Alaska Airlines, Inc., to provide Essential Air Service (EAS) at Cordova, Gustavus, and Yakutat, Alaska, for $4,827,052 annual subsidy and at Petersburg and Wrangell at an annual subsidy rate of $3,476,579, from May 1, 2013, through April 30, 2015.

External links
 Topographic map from USGS The National Map
 FAA Alaska airport diagram 
 

Airports in Petersburg Borough, Alaska
Essential Air Service